Symphony No. 19 can refer to:

Symphony No. 19 (Mozart)
Symphony No. 19 (Haydn)
Symphony No. 19 (Michael Haydn)

019